Thomas Fessenden may refer to:

Thomas Green Fessenden (1771–1837), American author and editor
T. A. D. Fessenden (1826–1868), American politician